The Mobridge Masonic Temple in Mobridge, South Dakota is a building from 1923. It was listed on the National Register of Historic Places in 1977.

It was deemed notable as it "is the only known example of Egyptian Revival architecture from the eclectic period in South Dakota. It has many of the elements that are common to this style: battered walls; window enframements that narrow upward; narrow banded reed lotus columns; and a gorge and roll cornice above the entry. All of these create a definite Egyptian appearance."

References

Masonic buildings completed in 1923
Buildings and structures in Walworth County, South Dakota
Masonic buildings in South Dakota
Clubhouses on the National Register of Historic Places in South Dakota
National Register of Historic Places in Walworth County, South Dakota
Egyptian Revival architecture in the United States